Paul Kaye (born 15 December 1964) is an English comedian and actor. He is known for his portrayals of shock interviewer Dennis Pennis on The Sunday Show, New York lawyer Mike Strutter on MTV's Strutter, Thoros of Myr in HBO's Game of Thrones, and Vincent the Fox on the BBC comedy Mongrels.

Early life
Kaye was born in the Clapham area of London on 15 December 1964. He and his twin sister were adopted by Jackie and Ivan Kaye and raised in Wembley, where their adoptive parents ran a sportswear shop. He is of Jewish background. He was a promising schoolboy athlete who achieved an impressive time in the 100-metre race. He later became a fan of punk rock, particularly the Sex Pistols bassist Sid Vicious. At the age of 16, he entered Harrow Art School on a two-year foundation course, and achieved a distinction before earning a first-class degree in Theatre Design from Nottingham Trent University (then called Trent Polytechnic).

Career

Early career

On graduation, Kaye designed theatre posters for the King's Head, the Bush Theatre, and the Gate Theatre, Notting Hill. He was a scene painter at the Old Vic Theatre in Waterloo and illustrated regularly for the NME, i-D, Literary Review, Time Out and International Musician magazines between 1987 and 1989. He had two exhibitions of illustration and poster work between 1989 and 1990, firstly at the Soho House Theatre, and then at The Drill Hall.

Kaye formed and sang in many bands, notably the dark psychedelic outfit We Are Pleb, who played extensively in Camden during 1988–89 (at the same time as Blur and Suede) and had a penchant for setting the stage on fire. Kaye was signed to Go Discs in 1992 with a group called TV Eye (formed with ex-members of the band Eat), which released two singles, "Killer Fly" and "Eradicator".

In 1993, Kaye filmed a prototype Dennis Pennis, interviewing his own band on a late-night indie music show on Granada TV called Transmission. After the interview, Kaye then went out with the crew, got very drunk and offended as many people as possible up and down Oxford Street. This tape somehow arrived on the desk of producers at Planet 24 six months later, and they offered Kaye the job of knocking on people's doors at 6.00am on The Big Breakfast. Kaye turned them down, preferring to stay on the dole and stick with We Are Pleb; Mark Lamarr eventually took the job.

Kaye was the in-house graphic designer for Tottenham Hotspur. He had an office in White Hart Lane and designed merchandise for Spurs, Derby County, Southampton and Aston Villa for Danish sportswear brand Hummel International (doing caricatures of Paul Gascoigne for school lunchboxes etc.). As an Arsenal fan, Kaye has said there are subliminal cannons contained within his work for Spurs, most notably a pen and ink drawing of Tottenham's new stand on a catalogue cover which features a minute cannon in the crowd: 70,000 were printed. Kaye became in-house theatre designer of the Bet Zvi Drama Academy in Tel Aviv for 12 months in 1994, designing all the in-house productions in their studio theatre.

His TV debut was on The Word being secretly filmed in Oliver Reed's dressing room. Kaye recalls "Reed had drunk two bottles of vodka, taken all his clothes off and I honestly thought he was going to kill me on live television. I swore in bed that I'd never do a celebrity interview again. Typically, six months later I'd come up with Dennis Pennis."

In 1994, Kaye convinced his old friend Anthony Hines (a car mechanic and some time roadie for TV Eye) to help him write Dennis Pennis when he was offered the job on The Sunday Show. (Hines was later poached by Sacha Baron Cohen to write for Ali G on The Eleven O'Clock Show and went on to receive an Oscar nomination for co-writing Borat in 2006).

Dennis Pennis
Celebrity interviewer Dennis Pennis, created by Kaye and Hines, was one of Kaye's best-known characters. With dyed red hair, gaudy jackets adorned with punk-style badges, and thick glasses, Pennis stood out from the crowd and asked celebrities atypical questions, ranging from playful to cruel. After brief stints presenting two episodes of Transmission (ITV's early 1990s indie music magazine show) as Pennis, the character next appeared in 1995 on BBC2's The Sunday Show. The basic premise was that Kaye and a camera crew would visit film premieres, press functions, and other assorted celebrity gatherings to attempt to get an "interview" with stars, in between short skits and sketches featuring the character.

Originally, the celebrities would be mainly British stars harassed at assorted London-based events, such as actor Hugh Grant, TV host Ulrika Jonsson, and sports pundit Des Lynam. A late night half-hour one-off special aired on 15 September 1995 on BBC2 called Anyone For Pennis?, which contained previously unseen footage that couldn't be shown on The Sunday Show due to the show's pre-watershed slot at lunchtime. When the Pennis character took off, Kaye was afforded a budget large enough to travel to Cannes, Hollywood, and Venice to record footage for a two-part special on 9 and 16 August 1996 on BBC2 called Very Important Pennis. His victims from this point on were much more renowned, the most famous of whom were Arnold Schwarzenegger, Demi Moore, Kevin Costner, Morgan Freeman and Bruce Willis, amid a raft of other Hollywood A-list stars. It was apparent that these victims were unsettled and unhappy with Pennis' unique line of questioning. Some stars, such as Costner, insulted him back, while others, such as Moore, simply declined to comment and left. Pennis was visibly amused at the look of disgust on some of the stars' faces. There was some controversy when Pennis asked of Steve Martin, "How come you're not funny any more?" Martin subsequently cancelled all scheduled press interviews. Kaye later said that he regretted this interview for a while, but nevertheless said, "Anyone who thinks they can improve on Bilko and Inspector Clouseau needs a slap, don't they?"

A special one hour video-only feature was released in 1997 called Dennis Pennis RIP: Too Rude to Live, which saw the character killed off. As Kaye reportedly explained, "Dennis Pennis had become too expensive. Taking a film crew out every night with no guarantee of getting even a minute's worth of footage of me harassing celebs was just stupid. And then the programme would take months to compile, and it was just boring, man... hanging out in the rain, twiddling your thumbs, playing with your hip flask... he had to go... at the risk of sounding a bit wanky, Pennis was more of an art project in my mind, living out my fantasy of being a naughty boy. Once I'd packed it in, I had no intention of ever doing anything like it again." However, Pennis did appear in public one last time in June 1997 on the main stage at Glastonbury introducing the headliners that night The Prodigy, the band had been a big fan of Pennis' character and had requested him personally. Indeed Kaye as his Pennis character conducted the 60,000+ crowd in a sing-song during a power cut in the bands set that evening. Kaye became very friendly with the band and particularly leader Liam Howlett

Post-Pennis career

In 1998, Kaye appeared in the video to the Fat Les song "Vindaloo" as a Richard Ashcroft look-alike. That same year, he also appeared as the character DI Lindsay De Paul in the TV comedy movie You Are Here.

Kaye also appeared as the singer of a fictional punk band called Spunk in a 1999 mock-documentary of the same name, which appeared as the 'wrath' part of a Channel 4 series on the seven deadly sins.

In 2000, Kaye starred in the comedy series Perfect World, a sitcom about a down-on-his-luck marketing manager. He also briefly presented a BBC2 quiz show, Liar, in which six contestants would all have a supposed claim to fame and the studio audience voted on which one they believed was telling the truth. In the same year, Kaye took a dramatic role alongside Michelle Collins in Two Thousand Acres of Sky.

In 2004, Kaye played the leading role in the film Blackball. His role as deaf DJ Frankie Wilde in the 2005 mockumentary It's All Gone Pete Tong won him the Film Discovery Jury Award at the 2005 US Comedy Arts Festival. He played in two episodes of the BBC drama series Waking the Dead, playing Dr. David Carney in "Shadowplay". Television appearances in 2006 and 2007 include episodes of Hustle, EastEnders and Kingdom. Kaye is now the chief interviewer on rockworld.tv, in which he interviews up-and-coming punk/indie bands.

Kaye appeared in Hotel Babylon (11 March 2008, BBC One), Pulling (Series 2, March 2008, BBC Three), and as Uncle Gorwel in A Child's Christmases in Wales by Mark Watson (17 December 2009, BBC Four and 24 December 2009, BBC One Wales).

From November 2010 to January 2011, Kaye played Matilda's father Mr. Wormwood in the Royal Shakespeare Company's musical Matilda, based on the classic Roald Dahl novel of the same name. Kaye reprised the role when the musical transferred to the Cambridge Theatre in London's West End in October 2011. In April 2012, Kaye was nominated for an Olivier Award for Best Supporting Actor in a Musical.

From August 2012, he appeared as a character called Maurice in UK TV adverts for betting website BetVictor.

In 2013, Kaye appeared as Thoros of Myr in the third season of the HBO series Game of Thrones, and as Danno in the BBC Radio 4 series Love in Recovery. In 2016, he reprised his role as Thoros of Myr in the sixth season of Game of Thrones, and returned for the seventh season.

In 2014, Kaye played Brother Lucian in the movie Dracula Untold. In 2015 he played a criminal in the BBC drama The Interceptor.

In 2015, he featured as the drunken, haunted Naval Officer Harry Brewer in the National Theatre's revival of Our Country's Good. He also appeared in Doctor Who as an alien funeral director. That same year, He played Vinculus in Susanna Clarke's Jonathan Strange & Mr Norrell.

Kaye's other television credits include The Trial of Elizabeth Gadge, an episode of Reece Shearsmith and Steve Pemberton's anthology series Inside No. 9, Netflix's first original TV series Lilyhammer, the BAFTA winning Murder in Successville, BBC miniseries Three Girls, Sky comedy Zapped, Drunk History, The Windsors, Urban Myths, Terry Pratchett: Back in Black, and the adaptation of Terry Pratchett and Neil Gaiman's Good Omens.

In 2017, Kaye appeared onstage as Chilean bomb maker Jose Miguel in B, a new play by Guillermo Calderón at the Royal Court Theatre. He appears as Dr. Malcolm Donahue, the pathologist in ITV's Vera until  2023. Kaye has appeared as Danno, who is a recovering alcoholic attending Alcoholic Anonymous (AA) meetings in Pete Jackson's BBC Radio 4 comedy drama series Love in Recovery.

In 2019, Kaye debuted as hospital chaplain Daniel Booth in the ITV dramedy Cold Feet, and played a psychiatrist in the Netflix comedy series After Life.

In 2020, he appeared in the Netflix drama The Stranger, as Patrick Katz, and portrayed "The Cowboy" in the HBO miniseries The Third Day. In 2021, he played Guy Forks in a Bonfire Night special of Mackenzie Crook's re-working of Worzel Gummidge for the BBC.

Personal life
In 1983, Kaye took a year out of university and lived on Israel's Gvar'am kibbutz, where he met an Israeli woman, Orly Katz. They were married in 1989. They have two sons and live in the Hendon area of London.

In January 2009, Kaye wrote an article for The Guardian in which he called for peace between Israel and Palestine after his mother-in-law was killed by a Hamas rocket strike on the Gvar'am kibbutz. He stated, "My eldest son has Israeli citizenship and in two years he will have to choose either to relinquish that citizenship or to fight in the Israeli army. It can be only his choice. But, unlike the Palestinians in Gaza, at least he has one."

In March 2019, Kaye gave a reading at the funeral of The Prodigy frontman Keith Flint.

Filmography

Film

Television

Web

Video games

Awards
Kaye has been nominated for a number of film awards:

Best Actor – US Comedy Arts Festival (Won) (It's All Gone Pete Tong)
Best Actor – Method Fest (Nominated) (It's All Gone Pete Tong)
Best Performance by an Actor in a Leading Role – Genie Awards (Nominated) (It's All Gone Pete Tong)

He has been nominated for two major theatre awards:

Best Supporting Actor in a Musical – WhatsOnStage Awards (Nominated) (Matilda the Musical)
Best Performance in a Supporting Role in a Musical – Olivier Awards (Nominated) (Matilda the Musical)

References

External links

4 Nov 2006 Guardian Interview of Paul Kaye & Mike Strutter
BBC Interview with Paul Kaye about Two Thousand Acres of Sky
Official site for It's all gone Pete Tong
Paul Kaye Exclusive Interview
The Velvet Onion: Interview

1964 births
20th-century English male actors
21st-century English male actors
Alumni of Nottingham Trent University
Comedians from London
English adoptees
English male comedians
English male film actors
English male musical theatre actors
English male television actors
English male voice actors
Jewish English male actors
Jewish male comedians
Living people
Male actors from London
People from Clapham
Actors from Wembley
English twins
Comedians from Wembley